is a Japanese journalist and businessman. He is the Representative Director, Editor-in-Chief of the Yomiuri Shimbun Holdings company, which publishes the largest Japanese daily newspaper Yomiuri Shimbun and substantially controls the largest Japanese commercial television network Nippon Television Network. He has served as the Editor-in-Chief of The Yomiuri Shimbun since 1985.

When the Japan Professional Soccer League was established, he insisted that each football club should put each company's name on the football clubs. Usually, in Europe and the United States, each professional team or club put each city's name on the team. In August 2004, Watanabe resigned as Yomiuri Giants (owned by the Yomiuri Shimbun) president after it was revealed that the Giants baseball club had violated scouting rules by paying ¥2 million to pitching prospect Yasuhiro Ichiba. Ten months later, Watanabe was hired as chairman of the team.

Concerned by the way unfinished business concerning the war continued to hinder Japan's progress, Watanabe set up a War Responsibility Re-examination Committee at Yomiuri Shimbun to undertake a 14-month investigation into the causes of Japan's Pacific War. The committee concluded that, "not only high-ranking government leaders, generals and admirals should shoulder the blame."

Honours 
 Grand Cordon of the Order of the Rising Sun (2008)

References

External links 
 Shadow Shogun Steps Into Light, to Change Japan. The New York Times, February 11, 2006.
 Tsuneo Watanabe named Cannes 2007 Media Person of the year
 The Most Powerful Publisher You’ve Never Heard of.'The Economist'', November 14, 2007.

1926 births
Living people
Baseball executives
Japanese journalists
Japanese sports businesspeople
Newspaper executives
Businesspeople from Tokyo
University of Tokyo alumni
Yomiuri Giants
Grand Cordons of the Order of the Rising Sun